Berrettoni is an Italian surname. Notable people with the surname include:

Emanuele Berrettoni (born 1981), Italian footballer
Niccolò Berrettoni (1637–1682), Italian Baroque painter

See also
Berrettini

Italian-language surnames